Johan Heijm (16 November 1904 – 13 March 1990) was a Dutch wrestler. He competed in the men's Greco-Roman light heavyweight at the 1928 Summer Olympics.

References

1904 births
1990 deaths
Dutch male sport wrestlers
Olympic wrestlers of the Netherlands
Wrestlers at the 1928 Summer Olympics
Sportspeople from Amsterdam